Enric Juliana Ricart (born 1957) is a Spanish journalist and political commentator.

Biography 
A member of the Unified Socialist Party of Catalonia (PSUC) in his youth, he also was a member of the editorial office of the weekly party magazine Treball.

He was hired by La Vanguardia in 1991. From 1997 to 2000, he was destined as correspondent to Italy. He was appointed as deputy-editor of La Vanguardia in 2000, also becoming the newspaper's delegate to Madrid in 2004.

Works 
Author
 
 
 
Coauthor

Decorations 
 Commander of the Order of the Star of Italian Solidarity (2009)

References 
Citations

Bibliography
 
 
 
 
 
 
 

Spanish journalists
1957 births
La Vanguardia people
Living people